X is a 24-episode anime television series, are based on Clamp's manga with the same name. The series was produced by Madhouse and directed by Yoshiaki Kawajiri, being first announced by the manga artists group on October 18, 2000. The story takes place at the end of days, in the year 1999. The series follows Kamui Shiro, a young esper who returns home to Tokyo after a six-year absence to face his destiny as the one who will determine humanity's fate.

The script was handled by Hiroko Tokita, Kazuyuki Fudeyasu, Kenji Sugihara and Yuki Enatsu. Koshinori Kanemori adapted Clamp's character designs and served as art director alongside Yuji Ikeda. Clamp headwriter Nanase Ohkawa stated the manga group left everything in the hands of staff in charge for it, including the scripts, the cast choices and everything else. As a result, Ohkawa considered herself and her colleagues as viewers. They found the television series as a proper adaptation of the manga even though the source material never reached its ending.

In anticipation to the series premiere, an original video animation (OVA) was produced: . It was directed-to-DVD on August 25, 2001. Written and directed by Kawajiri, the OVA tells the story of the upcoming battles through the prophecies of Kakyō Kuzuki, dreamgazer for the organization Dragon of Earth, and acts as primer for viewers not familiar with Clamp's manga. The series premiered on October 3, 2001, on WOWOW satellite television and finished on March 27, 2002, totaling twenty-four episodes. A total of twelve DVD volumes from the series, each containing two episodes, were released in Japan from February 25, 2001, to January 25, 2002, by Bandai Visual.

The series was first licensed in North America by Pioneer Entertainment in March 2002. Geneon collected the series and the OVA in a total of eight DVD volumes released between September 24, 2002, and November 25, 2003. Two DVD box sets of the series were also released on January 11, 2005. In 2006, Geneon released the X TV Series Re-Mix, which was composed of five individual DVDs released between July 11, 2006, and November 14, 2006, as well as a DVD box set on July 11, 2006. The DVDs came with re-mastered video and audio, including remixed 5.1 Dolby Digital AC3 surround sound for both the Japanese and English tracks. In September 2009, Funimation Entertainment announced that it had acquired the rights to the anime series and OVA. They were re-released them in a DVD box it on June 15, 2010, using the original Geneon dubbing (provided by Bang Zoom! Entertainment) for the English-language audio track. The series was also streamed in Hulu in 2010 by Funimation.

The music for the series was composed by Naoki Satō with two original soundtracks being released. The TV series uses two theme songs: "eX Dream" by Masatoshi Nishimura (credited as "Myuji") is used as the opening theme, while "Secret Sorrow" by Kohei Koizumi is used as the ending theme. The OVA's ending theme is "STRENGTH" by Kouhei Koizumi.

Episode list

Home media release

Japanese

English
North America

Remix

Boxsets

Region 2

References
General

Specific

Episodes
X 1999